Agartala City Baptist Church (Krishnanagar Baptist Church)  is a Baptist Church in the city of Agartala, the capital of Tripura state in India. It is affiliated to the Tripura Baptist Christian Union (TBCU) and is located in Krishnanagar locality in the central part of Agartala city.

History
The Church was set up in 1987 by some Christians leaders of that time. As time evolved the church grew in members and in faith.  there are more than 130 registered members.

Community 

Pastor : 
 Rev. Rana Kusum Debbarma

Deacons: Deacon Kajal Debbarma, Deacon Abhijit Debbarma & Chandra Mani Debbarma.
 
  

Committee:
 Secretary: Mr. Bilas Debbarma
 Treasurer:Mr. Chitta Ranjan Debbarma
 Youth Secretary: Mr. Pitor Debbarma
 Youth Treasurer: Ms. Elizabeth Debbarma
 Women Secretary:

Membership 
There are more than  130 registered members.

Affiliation 
The church comes under the Jamilwng Pastoral Circle of the Sadar North Baptist Association of TBCU.

See also 
 National Liberation Front of Tripura
 Agartala Baptist Church
 AKSB

Notes and references

Baptist churches in India
Christian organizations established in 1987
Churches in Agartala
Tripura Baptist Christian Union